The maximum theorem provides conditions for the continuity of an optimized function and the set of its maximizers with respect to its parameters. The statement was first proven by Claude Berge in 1959. The theorem is primarily used in mathematical economics and optimal control.

Statement of theorem
Maximum Theorem. 
Let  and  be topological spaces,  be a continuous function on the product , and  be a compact-valued correspondence such that  for all . Define the marginal function (or value function)  by

and the set of maximizers  by

.

Interpretation
The theorem is typically interpreted as providing conditions for a parametric optimization problem to have continuous solutions with regard to the parameter. In this case,  is the parameter space,  is the function to be maximized, and  gives the constraint set that  is maximized over.

The result is that if the elements of an optimization problem are sufficiently continuous, then some, but not all, of that continuity is preserved in the solutions.

Proof
Throughout this proof we will use the term neighborhood to refer to an open set containing a particular point. We preface with a preliminary lemma, which is a general fact in the calculus of correspondences. Recall that a correspondence is closed if its graph is closed.

Lemma. 

Let , and suppose  is an open set containing . If , then the result follows immediately. The collection of sets  forms an open cover of the compact set , which allows us to extract a finite subcover . By upper hemicontinuity, there is a neighborhood  of  such that . Then whenever , we have , and so . This completes the proof. 

Theorem 1. 

Fix , and let  be arbitrary. For each , there exists a neighborhood  of  such that whenever , we have . Furthermore, since  is upper hemicontinuous, there exists a neighborhood  of  such that whenever  it follows that . Let . It follows that

which was desired. 

Theorem 2. 

 
Fix , and let  be arbitrary. 
Now, since  is lower semicontinuous, there exists a neighborhood  of  such that whenever  we have . Observe that  (in particular). Therefore, since  is lower hemicontinuous, there exists a neighborhood  such that whenever  there exists . 
Let . 
Then whenever  there exists , which implies 

which was desired. 

Under the hypotheses of the Maximum theorem,  is continuous. It remains to verify that  is an upper hemicontinuous correspondence with compact values. Let . The Extreme Value theorem implies that  is nonempty. In addition, since  is continuous, it follows that  a closed subset of the compact set , which implies  is compact. Since   is a continuous function,  is a closed correspondence. Moreover, since ,  the preliminary Lemma implies that  is upper hemicontinuous.

Variants and generalizations
A natural generalization from the above results gives sufficient local conditions for to be continuous and to be nonempty, compact-valued, and upper semi-continuous.

Similarly to above, if  is strictly concave, then  is a continuous function.

It is also possible to generalize Berge's theorem to non-compact correspondences if the objective function is K-inf-compact.

Examples
Consider a utility maximization problem where a consumer makes a choice from their budget set. Translating from the notation above to the standard consumer theory notation,
  is the space of all bundles of  commodities,
  represents the price vector of the commodities  and the consumer's wealth ,
  is the consumer's utility function, and
  is the consumer's budget set.

Then, 
  is the indirect utility function and
  is the Marshallian demand.

Proofs in general equilibrium theory often apply the Brouwer or Kakutani fixed-point theorems to the consumer's demand, which require compactness and continuity, and the maximum theorem provides the sufficient conditions to do so.

See also
 Envelope theorem
Brouwer fixed point theorem
Kakutani fixed point theorem for correspondences

Notes

References
 
 
 

Theory of continuous functions
Convex optimization
Mathematical economics
Mathematical optimization
Mathematical theorems
Theorems in analysis